is a science fiction animated series that premiered on September 13, 1986 on CBS and ran for 13 episodes until December 6, 1986. The series was created by Chris Columbus and featured music and a theme song composed by Don Felder. The series was later shown in reruns on Sci-Fi Channel's Cartoon Quest.

Synopsis
Two Earth teenagers are accepted into the intergalactic high school Galaxy High School on the fictional asteroid Flutor. The teenage boy, Doyle Cleverlobe, was a skilled athlete and popular, while the teenage girl Aimee Brighttower was shy and, as the theme song states, "the smartest girl in school, not very popular, not very cool." But once in space, their roles are somewhat reversed. The alien teenagers seem to accept the not-so-popular Aimee, while Doyle tends to rub the aliens the wrong way. Although Doyle finds himself an outcast and has difficulties adjusting, Aimee does not abandon him, and suggests he can make friends and bring glory to Galaxy High through his excellent sporting abilities, which he does by winning a championship in "psych-hockey", which Galaxy High had always lost in the past. The show drops many hints of a budding romance between Doyle and Aimee, but it was never given time to grow as the show was not renewed for a second season.

The aliens in the school included Gilda Gossip, the girl with a big mouth (or rather mouths), Booey Bubblehead, an absent-minded girl with a bubble for a head, Milo de Venus, the six-armed class president, Beef and the Bonk Bunch who bully Doyle (and just about every student at Galaxy High), and the Creep, a small alien resembling something between a fat cherub and a yellow marshmallow who had a huge crush on Aimee, which often revealed itself as he serenaded like a Las Vegas lounge singer. The teachers are even more unusual than the students: Ms. Biddy McBrain has a light bulb attached to her head, while Coach Frogface eats flies and Professor Icenstein has to keep his classroom cold to keep him from melting.

Cast
Susan Blu as Aimee Brightower
Hal Rayle as Doyle Cleverlobe
Howard Morris as Professor Icenstein and Luigi La Bounci (plus other miscellaneous voices)
Pat Carroll as Ms. Biddy McBrain
Nancy Cartwright as "Flat" Freddy Fender and Gilda Gossip
Guy Christopher as Earl Eccchhh
Gino Conforti as Ollie Oilslick the cabbie and Reggie Unicycle
Jennifer Darling as Booey Bubblehead, Myrtle Blastermeier and Wendy Garbo
Pat Fraley as Coach Frogface and Sludge the janitor
Henry Gibson as Doyle's locker
David L. Lander as Milo de Venus
 Danny Mann as the Creep
Neil Ross as Rotten Roland
John Stephenson as Beef Bonk and Harvey Blastermeier

Crew
Howard Morris - Voice Director

Episodes

Production notes
The animated series Partridge Family 2200 A.D., which debuted in 1974, features Keith and Laurie Partridge going to a futuristic space high school called "Galaxy High," and Laurie's friend Marion Moonglow (a Martian) bears a striking resemblance to the Wendy Garbo character from this series.

Galaxy High School was animated, distributed and owned by TMS Entertainment. TMS produced Galaxy High as an attempt to create a similar series to their hit Japanese anime show Urusei Yatsura (released 1981, based on a 1978 manga) for the American market. While Urusei Yatsura involves an alien girl attending a human high school, the school scenario in Galaxy High is reversed to be based around humans attending a high school for aliens.

John Kricfalusi was a character designer for the show and went on to create Ren & Stimpy and The Ripping Friends.

Syd Iwanter, the creative director, came up with the concept and hired Kricfalusi to draw a one-sheet pitch featuring the main characters for a proposed HIGH SCHOOL 2525. When Michael Chase Walker became director of children's programs for the CBS Television Network, he bought the show, changed the name to Galaxy High School and convinced up-and-coming screenwriter Chris Columbus to develop the show under his name. Walker was trying to develop a Saturday morning schedule that resembled an old-fashioned Saturday movie matinée with a range of horror (Teen Wolf), science fiction (Galaxy High School), comedy (Pee-wee's Playhouse) and Western (Wildfire). 

An alternate theme song exists showing clips from various episodes. The theme was changed to an instrumental one. At the end, Aimee speaks "Here we are Doyle! The only two kids from Earth at a high school in outer space! How do you feel?" Doyle responds "A little spaced out, Aimee!"

The show features transportation tubes, which people can enter and be whisked away around the school; these are reminiscent of old-style pneumatic tubes. In Galaxy High, they are known as "wooshers".

The show had been granted two time slots by CBS, for its 1986 and 1987 Saturday mornings, with the expectation of a two-season contract. When the show was not renewed for a second season, CBS elected to rerun the first season in its 1987 time slot, in order to make up for episodes that had been preempted by Saturday sporting events in 1986. Chris Columbus later remarked that CBS had been ambivalent about whether or not there would be a renewal, and had written one script in anticipation of a second season. The sole unproduced episode of Galaxy High concerned cliquish divisions in Galaxy High which start with pranks and food fights, but soon culminate into a school "civil war", causing Galaxy High's board of trustees to notice this and threaten to shut down the school.

Film
In 1996, Walker optioned the film rights with John H. Williams of Vanguard Films, and reteamed with Chris Columbus to develop the big screen version of Galaxy High School. After various development deals with both DreamWorks and Paramount Pictures, the movie plans remain in limbo.

Series tie-in
An 85-page paperback book titled Galaxy High School was published in August 1987 by Bantam-Skylark Books and written by Ann Hodgman. It is an adaptation of six episodes, "Welcome to Galaxy High", "Those Eyes, Those Lips", "The Beef Who Would Be King", "Dollars and Sense", "Beach Blanket Blow-Up" and "Founder's Day". In the prologue, it says that Doyle and Aimee, while on Earth, attended Presley High School and its sports team was called the Hound Dogs. It also says that Aimee didn't know Doyle well before coming to Galaxy High, but did think he was cute, until they actually meet when first entering their new school. The paperback is out-of-print and is a highly sought collectible among fans of the show.

Airdates
Galaxy High School originally aired at 11:00am EST/10:00am CST after Teen Wolf and before CBS Storybreak in the 1986-1987 season on CBS. It was also given a timeslot for the 1987-1988 CBS season in the expectation of a second season, but upon the show's retirement the 1987–1988 schedules re-ran episodes of the first season.

Later airdates: 2 January 1988 – 27 August 1988 on CBS, January 2, 1994–?, July 2, 1994–September 24, 1994, October 8, 1994–December 31, 1994–early 1995, 7 February 1996 – 23 February 1996, April 2, 1996 – April 19, 1996, May 27, 1996–June 17, 1996 on the Sci Fi Channel.

In 1996, the show aired on Nickelodeon on weekday mornings in the United Kingdom. Prior to that, in the early-to-mid 1990's, it aired on ITV's breakfast programmes, TV-AM and later GMTV.

Awards
The show was nominated for a Humanitas Prize for its anti-drug episode "The Brain Blaster".

Legacy
Galaxy High appears frequently in the 1980s animation magazine cereal:geek.
The role-playing game Teenagers from Outer Space released in 1987 expanded upon this concept.
Episode 17 of Space Dandy features a similar setting.

Home media releases
Four episodes of the show were re-edited into a compilation video titled Galaxy High in 1989 by Family Home Entertainment

Galaxy High School has been released in full on DVD. All 13 episodes are available uncut and as they were originally aired, across two volumes, produced and distributed by Media Blasters through their Anime Works imprint.

In the United Kingdom, during 1989, Channel 5 Video released the first two episodes of the television series on video.

References

External links

Galaxy High School at Don Markstein's Toonopedia. Archived from the original on August 21, 2015.
Galaxy High at ClassicKidsTV.co.uk
TMS Entertainment (Japanese)

1980s American animated television series
1980s American high school television series
1986 American television series debuts
1986 American television series endings
1986 Japanese television series debuts
1986 Japanese television series endings
American children's animated comic science fiction television series
American children's animated science fantasy television series
American children's animated space adventure television series
Japanese children's animated comic science fiction television series
Japanese children's animated science fantasy television series
Japanese children's animated space adventure television series
Anime-influenced Western animated television series
Animated television series about extraterrestrial life
CBS original programming
Fictional high schools
Japanese high school television series
TMS Entertainment
Television series set in 1986
Teen animated television series